The Duwamish tribe is a Native American tribe in western Washington, and the indigenous people of metropolitan Seattle.  The Duwamish tribe today includes the People of the Inside (Dxw'Dəw?Abš), for Elliott Bay environs today; and the People of the Large Lake (Xacuabš), for those around Lake Washington of today.

Includes the sources referenced in Cheshiahud (Lake John) and History of Seattle before white settlement.
 
   and 
   Map is NE Seattle around Sand Point-Magnuson Park, for which there is no common name.
 
   Completely reformatted, greatly revised and expanded update of Hess, Thom, Dictionary of Puget Salish (University of Washington Press, 1976).
 
    Also Me-Kwa-Mooks Park (update 24 September 2004), Seattle Parks and Recreation.
 
   Same as "The Influenza Pandemic of 1918"
   A periodic electronic newsletter
 
 
 
 
   Negative Number: SHS 2228, Museum of History and Industry, Seattle .
 
   Authors referenced Daniel Jack Chasan, The Water Link: A History of Puget Sound as a Resource (Seattle: University of Washington Press, 1981); The Gale Encyclopedia of Native American Tribes ed. by Sharon Malinowsky, Anna Sheets, Jeffrey Lehman, Melissa Walsh Doig (Detroit: Gale, 1998), 285; Fay G. Cohen, Treaties on Trial: the Continuing Controversy over Northwest Indian Fishing Rights (Seattle: University of Washington Press, 1986).
   Page links to Village Descriptions Duwamish-Seattle section .  Dailey referenced "Puget Sound Geography" by T. T. Waterman.  Washington DC:  National Anthropological Archives, mss. [n.d.] [ref. 2]; Duwamish et al. vs. United States of America, F-275.  Washington DC: US Court of Claims, 1927. [ref. 5]; "Indian Lake Washington" by David Buerge in the Seattle Weekly, 1–7 August 1984 [ref. 8]; "Seattle Before Seattle" by David Buerge in the Seattle Weekly, 17–23 December 1980. [ref. 9]; The Puyallup-Nisqually by Marian W. Smith.  New York: Columbia University Press, 1940. [ref. 10].  Recommended start is "Coast Salish Villages of Puget Sound" .
 
 
   Negative Number: NA591
   Dorpat referenced Dorpat, Seattle: Now and Then Vols. 1, 2, and 3. Seattle: Tartu Publications, 1984, 1988; Walt Crowley and Paul Dorpat, "The Ave: Streetcars to Street Fairs", typescript dated 1995 in possession of Walt Crowley and Paul Dorpat, Seattle, Washington; Walt Crowley,  Rites of Passage. Seattle: University of Washington Press, 1995; Cal McCune, From Romance to Riot: A Seattle Memoir. Seattle: Cal McCune, 1996; Roy Nielsen, UniverCity: The City Within City: The Story of the University District Seattle: University Lions Foundation, ca. 1986; Clark Humphrey, Loser: the Real Seattle Music Story. Portland, OR: Feral House, 1995.
  
 
 
 
 
   Highly regarded.
 
 
 
 
   Maps "NN-1120S", "NN-1130S", "NN-1140S".Jpg [sic] dated 13 June; "NN-1030S", "NN-1040S".jpg dated 17 June 2002.
   Good photos
  
 
 
  Includes bibliography.Original no longer available. As of 2009-04-09 a similar web page is at https://web.archive.org/web/20090213151404/http://duwamishtribe.org/chiefsiahl.html. Versions of the original are archived at https://web.archive.org/web/*/http://www.duwamishtribe.org/html/chief_si_ahl.html. The doc is archived at https://web.archive.org/web/20080119214434/http://www.duwamishtribe.org/Life_siahl.doc.
 
 
   Lange referenced a very extensive list.  Summary article 
   Lange referenced Lange, "Smallpox Epidemic of 1862 among Northwest Coast and Puget Sound Indians" , HistoryLink.org Online Encyclopedia of Washington State History.  Accessed 8 December 2000.
   Long referenced Hector Castro and Mike Barber, "After Decades, Duwamish Tribe Wins Federal Recognition", Seattle Post-Intelligencer January 20, 2001, (www.seattlep-i.com); Bernard McGhee, "Duwamish Tribe Wins Recognition", The Seattle Times, January 20, 2001, (www.seattletimes.com); Bureau of Indian Affairs, "BIA Issues Final Determination on the Recognition of the Duwamish Tribal Organization", News Release, January 19, 2001 (https://web.archive.org/web/20060901062007/http://www.doi.gov/bia/); Sara Jeanne Greene, "Chief Seattle's Tribe Clings to its Identity", The Seattle Times, June 18, 2001 (www.seattletimes.com); Susan Gilmore, "Duwamish Denied Tribal Status", Ibid., September 29, 2001 (http://seattletimes.nwsource.com/html/localnews/134347559_duwamish29m.html). Note: This file was revised on 3 August 2001 and again on 20 January 2001.
 
 
 
 
  
   Office of Business Relations and Economic Development
  
  
   Rochester referenced Christine Barrett, A History of Laurelhurst (Seattle, WA: Laurelhurst Community Club, 1981, revised 1989); Paul Dorpat, Seattle: Now & Then, Vols. II and III (Seattle, WA: Tartu Publications, 1984 and 1989); Lucile Saunders McDonald, The Lake Washington Story, (Seattle, WA: Superior Publishing Co., 1979); Brandt Morgan, Enjoying Seattle's Parks (Seattle, WA: Greenwood Publications, 1979); Harry W. Higman and Earl J. Larrison, Union Bay: The Life of a City Marsh, (Seattle, WA: University of Washington Press, 1951); J. Willis Sayre, This City of Ours (Seattle, WA: Seattle School District No. 1, 1936); Sophie Frye Bass, Pig-Tail Days in Old Seattle (Portland, OR: Binfords & Mort, 1937); Roger Sale, Seattle: Past to Present (Seattle, WA: University of Washington Press, 1976).
 * 
   Authors referenced an extensive list, most of them primary sources.  See the Bibliography at Licton Springs or Northgate for a complete reference.
 
 
 
 
  Speidel provides a substantial bibliography with extensive primary sources.
  Speidel provides a substantial bibliography with extensive primary sources.
 
 
 
   Tate referenced an autobiographical sketch by Arthur Denny found in William Farrand Prosser, A History of the Puget Sound Country; Its Resources, Its Commerce and Its People (New York: The Lewis Publishing Company, 1903); West Side Story ed. by Clay Eals (Seattle: Robinson Newspapers, 1987); [No author, title]. Olympia Columbian, June 4, 1853; Alexandra Harmon, Indians in the Making: Ethnic Relations and Indian Identities around Puget Sound (Berkeley: University of California Press, 1998); [No author, title]. Seattle Post-Intelligencer, December 21, 1996; Walt Crowley, National Trust Guide: Seattle (New York: John Wiley & Sons, Inc., 1998); [No author, title]. West Seattle News, May 15, 1903; [No author, title]. West Seattle Herald, February 2, 1924; [No author, title]. Seattle Post-Intelligencer, March 7, 1998; Ibid., November 13, 2000; [No author, title]. The Seattle Times, October 20, 1997; Ibid., February 24, 1998; Ibid., May 26, 2000; Albert Furtwangler, Answering Chief Seattle (Seattle: University of Washington Press, 1997); [No author, title]. Seattle Press-Times, March 7, 1893; Jane Wilson MacGowan, "Gully, Cove Fill Childhood with Memories", Neighbors, Spring 2000; [No author]. West Seattle Memories: Alki (Seattle: Southwest Seattle Historical Society, 1999); Brandt Morgan, Enjoying Seattle's Parks  (Westport, CT: Greenwood Publications, 1979); Deborah Bach, "Indians Are Out, Wildcats Are In at West Seattle High", Seattle Post-Intelligencer, April 25, 2003.
 
   Negative Number: MOHAI 83.10.9,067
   Wilma referenced "Petition: To the Honorable Arthur A. Denny, Delegate to Congress from Washington Territory," n.d., National Archives Roll 909, "Letters Received by the Office of Indian Affairs, 1824-81"; Pioneer Association of the State of Washington, "A Petition to Support Recognition of The Duwamish Indians as a 'Tribe', June 18, 1988, in possession of Ken Tollefson, Seattle, Washington.
   Wilma referenced "Lakewood Community Club", brochure, 1948, Rainier Valley Historical Society, Seattle; David Buerge, "Indian Lake Washington", The Weekly, August 1, 1984, pp. 29–33; Don Sherwood, "Seward Park - Graham Peninsula", "Interpretive Essays on the History of Seattle Parks", handwritten bound manuscript dated 1977, Seattle Room, Seattle Public Library; Don Sherwood, "Genessee P.F., Wetmore Slough", Ibid.; Don Sherwood, "Stanley S. Sayres Memorial Park", Ibid.; "Cougar captured near Lake Washington about February 23, 1870", Timeline Library, (www.Historylink.org); Paul Dorpat, Seattle Now and Then, (Seattle: Tartu Publications, 1984), 82; Lucile B. McDonald, The Lake Washington Story, (Seattle: Superior Publishing Co., 1979), 23, 87, 88; Redick H. McKee, Road Map of Seattle and Vicinity, 1890, Seattle Public Library; "Guide Map of the City of Seattle, Washington Territory", ca. 1888, brochure, Seattle Public Library; David Wilma Interview with Grover Haynes, president, Lakewood-Seward Park Community Club, March 31, 2001, Seattle, Washington.
   Wilma referenced "Petition: To the Honorable Arthur A. Denny, Delegate to Congress from Washington Territory," n.d., National Archives Roll 909, "Letters Received by the Office of Indian Affairs, 1824-81"; Pioneer Association of the State of Washington, "A Petition to Support Recognition of The Duwamish Indians as a 'Tribe', June 18, 1988, in possession of Ken Tollefson, Seattle, Washington.
   Negative Number: MOHAI 90.45.14, Museum of History and Industry, Seattle

Duwamish